Jersey Folklore Festival is a music festival held in Saint Helier, Jersey.  The venue is People's Park, with a possible capacity of 5,000 people, and two stages. A main stage situated inside a large marquee, and the smaller Agapanthus Stage which is named after the Agapanthus flowers which grow in the park.

History
The plan for this festival was announced after a different annual Jersey folk music festival called Grassroots came to an end, due to financial issues.

The 2013 festival was cancelled due to a lack of funding from Jersey's Tourism Development Fund and timing of permission to hold the event in St Peter.

2012
The 2012 event took place on 30 June to 1 July. 2,000 people attended over the weekend. The following acts performed on two stages;

Main Stage
Van Morrison Saturday night headliner
Ray Davies Sunday night headline act
Joan Armatrading
Nouvelle Vague
Lee "Scratch" Perry
Rodriguez
Badly Drawn Boy
Finley Quaye
Wanda Jackson
Jake Bugg
Lloyd Yates

Agapanthus Stage
John Cooper Clarke
John Shuttleworth
Edward Aczel
Stanley Forbes
The Recks
Ashiki
Rick Jones (musician)
Frankie Davies (musician)
Badlabecques (folk band performing in Jèrriais)
BBC Radio Jersey Live Show

See also
Jersey Live

References

Festivals in Jersey
Music festivals in Europe
2012 establishments in Jersey
Music festivals established in 2012
Folk festivals in Jersey